Short range air defense (SHORAD) is a group of anti-aircraft weapons and tactics that have to do with defense against low-altitude air threats, primarily helicopters and low-flying aircraft such as the A-10 or Sukhoi Su-25. SHORAD and its complements, HIMAD (High to Medium Air Defense) and THAAD (Terminal High Altitude Area Defense) divide air defense of the battlespace into domes of responsibility based on altitude and defensive weapon ranges.

Canada  

The Canadian Forces Land Force Command used the Air Defense Anti-Tank System (ADATS) based on the M113A2 prior to its retirement from service in 2012. ADATS is a completely self-contained system in an unmanned turret with FLIR (Forward-Looking Infrared) and TV sensors, laser rangefinder and designator, a search radar. Composed of eight missiles, the ADATS can find and hit multiple threats in few seconds.
Also in the Canadian Army, the Coyote Reconnaissance Vehicle and LAV III hold anti aircraft turrets that are capable of destroying attacking aircraft. They have a range of 2400 meters. After the withdrawal of the ADATS, Rheinmetall Canada made the AMADS (Advanced Man-portable Air Defense System) which serves as the short range air defense trainer for the Canadian army.

India

India started testing indigenous VSHORAD system. Multiple tests were conducted successfully. The missile uses dual thrust motors and is meant to take out low flying targets.

United States  

In the United States Army, Avenger air defense artillery battalions will be assigned to a theater or corps, and may attach air defense platoons to a brigade combat team or maneuver battalion. SHORAD units are based upon a mounted platform, the AN/TWQ-1 Avenger, which utilizes eight FIM-92 Stinger missiles coupled with a FLIR, laser range finder, and a M3P .50 caliber machine gun for close-in defense. 

The Army also ordered Stryker SHORAD platform, equipped with four Stinger and two AGM-114L Longbow Hellfire missiles, 30 mm M230 chain gun, 7.62 M240 machine gun, and a 360-degree search radar system. First vehicles were delivered in 2021, and a total of 144 vehicles will be deployed by 2025.

In the United States Marine Corps, there are only two existing Low Altitude Air Defense (LAAD) Battalions : 2d Low Altitude Air Defense Battalion and 3d Low Altitude Air Defense Battalion.

The following Military Occupational Specialties (MOS's) are related to SHORAD:
 14G: Air Defense Battle Management System Operator (formerly 14J)
 14P: Avenger Crew Member / MANPADS Fire Unit
 7212: Low Altitude Air Defense Gunner (USMC)

Norway
The Norwegian Army ordered "Mobile Ground Based Air Defence System" based on NASAMS 3, which includes air-mobile Humvee launchers capable of firing AIM-9X Sidewinder missiles and tracked launchers for IRIS-T SLS missiles.

Sweden 
The Swedish Army ordered LVRBS 98 systems based on a BvS 10 All Terrain Armoured Vehicle equipped with four IRIS-T SLS missiles.

See also

 Self-propelled anti-aircraft weapon

 Starstreak
 THAAD - Terminal High Altitude Area Defense

References

Anti-aircraft warfare